John of Garlande  may refer to:

 Johannes de Garlandia (philologist) (fl. c. 1205–1255)
 Johannes de Garlandia (music theorist) (fl. c. 1270–1320)